I Want to Go to Prison is a 1998 Russian comedy film directed by Alla Surikova.

Plot 
The film tells about the developer of "Zaporozhets", which happened misfortune. With his help, the bank was robbed, and he decided to voluntarily go to prison.

Cast 
 Vladimir Ilyin as Lyamkin
 Natalya Gundareva as Masha
 Alla Kliouka as Marie
 Mikhail Petrovsky as Chris
 Sergey Batalov as Vovan
 Boris Shcherbakov as Oleg Ivanovich
 Kira Surikova as Secretary
 Oleg Korytin as Russian Policeman #1
 Yury Lugovsky as Russian Policeman #2
 Oleg Bocharov as Bandit

References

External links 
 

1998 films
1990s Russian-language films
Russian comedy films
1998 comedy films